WCIL-FM (101.5 FM) is a radio station  broadcasting a contemporary hit radio format. Licensed to Carbondale, Illinois, the station serves the Marion-Carbondale area.  The station is currently owned by Max Media.

History
WCIL (AM) signed on the air in 1946 as a daytime-only station with personalities such as Jim Bowen, Bluegrass Roy and others in a second floor studio at about 215 W. Main St. in Carbondale.  At that time, to get the AM license, they were pressured by the FCC to also sign on an FM station.  They kept the FM on the air for about a year and then signed it off the air since, at the time, nobody listened to FM. In 1964, Paul F. McRoy, the station's then-owner, foresaw the potential of FM and applied for a new FM license.  The license was approved and WCIL-FM signed on in 1968 and allowed broadcasting after local sunset when WCIL was required to sign off.  WCIL-AM-FM simulcast the same programming on both stations.  The format was easy listening music and news.  A year before CIL-FM was born, Top 40 music was played at night after 10p.m.  The FCC required AM-FM simulcasts to split programming.  So, plans were made to split WCIL AM and FM.  The AM and FM split programming and became separate stations on August 16, 1976.  Before this split of the stations, WCIL-FM would sign off the air at 2a.m. and sign back on at 6a.m.  Once the stations split, CIL-FM Rockin' Radio was created. It was on the air 24 hours a day and never signed off since except for technical problems.  McRoy would go on to sell both WCIL-FM and AM to Dennis Lyle, now the President of the Illinois Broadcasters Association.

CIL-FM dominated ratings in the heyday of Top 40/CHR radio. The air-personalities were well known throughout the area. In the 1980s and 1990s, Programming Director Tony Waitekus propelled the station to national prominence.

It was announced in July 2018, that WCIL-FM would return as the radio home for Southern Illinois University Men’s basketball and football. WCIL-FM was the first radio for Saluki Athletics starting in the late 1970s, lasting for several years. The radio voice of the Salukis for football, & Men’s basketball is Mike Reis. The color commentator for football is Gene Green, and for men’s basketball it is Greg Starrick.

In August the 16th of 2023 CIL-FM will celebrated their 46th anniversary.

Ownership
In 1997, Dennis Lyle sold the stations to the Zimmer Radio Group. Soon after the sale, CIL-FM had a 1997 relaunch, from "Rockin' Radio" to "Today's Hit Music".

In 2004, Zimmer Radio Group sold their stations in southern Illinois (including WCIL-FM), along with Cape Girardeau, Poplar Bluff and Sikeston, Missouri, to Mississippi River Radio, a subsidiary of Max Media, LLC.  The reported value of this 17 station transaction was $43 million.

References

External links
WCIL-FM official website
History of WCIL
http://siualumni.com/s/664/index.aspx?sid=664&gid=1&pgid=15&cid=292&newsid=50

CIL-FM
Contemporary hit radio stations in the United States
Radio stations established in 1946
1946 establishments in Illinois
Max Media radio stations